The 2015–16 ABA season was the fifteenth season of the American Basketball Association. The season began in November 2015 and ended in March 2016. The playoffs were played in March 2016, with the finals in April 2016.

Season standings

References

American Basketball Association (2000–present) seasons
ABA